Yuri Georgievich Kondakov (born 24 November 1951) is a Russian/Ukrainian speed skater who competed for the Soviet Union in the 1976 Winter Olympics and in the 1980 Winter Olympics, as well as several European and World Championships in the 1970s.

He was World Junior allround Champion in 1972. As a senior his best result in the World allround Championships was a bronze medal in 1975. This year he won the Soviet allround Championships. In the European allround Championships his best result was 6th place, a result he recorded twice, in 1975 and 1978.
In 1976 he won the silver medal in the 1500 metres event at the Olympic Games in Innsbruck, behind the Norwegian Jan Egil Storholt.

Four years later he finished fifth in the 1500 metres competition of the 1980 Games.

World record 

Source: SpeedSkatingStats.com

References 

 Joeri Kondakov at SpeedSkatingStats.com
 profile

1951 births
Living people
Soviet male speed skaters
Olympic speed skaters of the Soviet Union
Speed skaters at the 1976 Winter Olympics
Speed skaters at the 1980 Winter Olympics
Olympic silver medalists for the Soviet Union
Olympic medalists in speed skating
World record setters in speed skating
World Allround Speed Skating Championships medalists
Medalists at the 1976 Winter Olympics
People from Lesnoy, Sverdlovsk Oblast
Sportspeople from Sverdlovsk Oblast